The red-tailed ground skink (Scincella rufocaudata) is a species of skink found in Vietnam and Cambodia.

References

Scincella
Reptiles of Vietnam
Reptiles described in 1983
Taxa named by Ilya Darevsky
Taxa named by Nguyen Van Sang